Jarvis Allen Johnson (born May 5, 1992) is an American YouTuber and former software engineer who has been operating his YouTube channel since October 12, 2006.

Early life 
Jarvis Allen Johnson was born on May 5, 1992. He was educated at Eastside High School in Gainesville, Florida, between 2006 and 2010, before graduating with an International Baccalaureate diploma and then moving on to the Georgia Institute of Technology, which he graduated from on August 2, 2014, with a Bachelor of Science high honors degree in computer science. He has worked for the Georgia Institute of Technology, Radiant Systems, Google, Yelp, and Patreon.

Career 
Johnson's YouTube channel was created on October 12, 2006, but he had other jobs before he regularly uploaded to the channel. He has worked as a student assistant then a teaching assistant at the Georgia Institute of Technology, a software developer intern at Radiant Systems, an engineering practicum intern at Google, a software engineer intern and a software engineer at Yelp, and a senior software engineer and an engineering manager at Patreon.

Johnson initially posted software engineering videos, before he began posting as a commentary YouTuber after watching a video from Drew Gooden and attempting to try Gooden's format. He quit his job at Patreon to post regularly on his channel. In August 2018, traffic to Johnson's channel increased after fellow YouTuber Cody Ko uploaded a video about 5-Minute Crafts, a topic that Johnson had already spoken about in March. As Johnson's video wasn't getting much traffic, Johnson saw Ko's video and decided to update his video's title to include "5-Minute Crafts" to attract more viewers. Johnson credited this video as his "breakout video."

Johnson's channel consists of various commentaries about software engineering and running jokes such as "Zeffo Overlord of 1-2-3 Go", and how "comically large" his computer science degree is. His channel also notably serves as a platform of active, though light-hearted, critique on content farms and their ability to game YouTube algorithms, giving attention towards their unvetted baiting media content, that can be seen to encourage manipulative behavior, whether regarding animated story channels based on untrue accounts or unproductive, or even dangerous, life hacks as popularized by the 5-Minute Crafts and Bright Side YouTube channels managed by TheSoul Publishing. In early 2021, Johnson was listed as one of Forbes "30 under 30" list of influential people for that year.

In May 2021, Johnson posted a video on Twitter captioned "what a normal and ultimate spaghetti hack!" The video consisted of a woman pouring Prego sauce onto a kitchen counter. The tweet gained international recognition, and Prego ended up on the trending page on Twitter. The video in the tweet was then taken down by the creator of the video, Rick Lax, two days later.

In July 2021, Rhett and Link announced that their production company, Mythical Entertainment, had acquired an ownership stake in the umbrella company Johnson founded for his various revenue streams.

Boxing record

Awards and nominations

Notes

References 

1992 births
Living people
African-American media personalities
American YouTubers
YouTube channels launched in 2006
21st-century African-American people
Eastside High School (Gainesville, Florida) alumni
Commentary YouTubers
Georgia Tech alumni
American software engineers